Bence Rakaczki (14 May 1993 – 16 January 2014) was a Hungarian football player who played for Diósgyőri VTK.

Rakaczki died of leukemia on 16 January 2014, aged 20.

References

External links
DVTK 
HLSZ 

1993 births
2014 deaths
Sportspeople from Miskolc
Hungarian footballers
Association football goalkeepers
Diósgyőri VTK players
Deaths from leukemia
Deaths from cancer in Hungary